Barry Moran  is a former Gaelic footballer who played at senior level for the Mayo county team until his retirement in July 2018. Moran also played club football for Castlebar Mitchels.

He started at midfield in the 2012 final which Mayo lost by 0-13 to 2-11 against Donegal.

References

Year of birth missing (living people)
Living people
Castlebar Mitchels Gaelic footballers
Mayo inter-county Gaelic footballers
People from Castlebar